Christian Congregation may refer to:

Church (congregation), a Christian body of followers meeting in a particular area
Christian Congregation (Pentecostal), an organization of Pentecostal churches with roots in the Italian Pentecostal Movement
Christian Congregation in the United States
Christian Congregation of Brazil
Christian Congregation in Ireland
Christian Congregation (Restoration Movement), a Congregational church in the United States
Christian Congregation of Jehovah's Witnesses, a Jehovah's Witnesses organization in the United States